László Marton may refer to:

 László Marton (director) (1943–2019), theatre director
 László Marton (rower) (1923–1989), Hungarian Olympic rower
 László Marton (sculptor) (1925–2008), Hungarian sculptor